"Green Green Grass" is a song by British singer-songwriter George Ezra. It was released on 22 April 2022, as the second single from Ezra's third studio album Gold Rush Kid. The song reached number three on the UK Singles Chart, becoming Ezra's seventh top ten song there and was nominated for the Brit Award for Song Of The Year at the 2023 Brit Awards.

Background
The song was inspired by a holiday trip to St. Lucia on Christmas 2018 by Ezra and his friends. About the lyrical background of the song, Ezra explained, "there was a street party going on, with three different sound systems, people cooking in the street. I asked a woman what was going on and she told me it was a funeral – for three people. They were celebrating three lives! I thought: that is not how we do this at home. And it's really beautiful".

The song release coincided with an announcement of his 2022 UK Arena Tour. He performed the song, as well as a cover of Mimi Webb's House on Fire which was released on 18 February, during a BBC Radio 1 Live Lounge performance on 19 May.

Ezra performed the song during the Platinum Jubilee Central Weekend in June 2022. The singer revealed that he was asked to omit the line "on the day that I die" from the performance beforehand.

Music video
The music video was released on 4 May 2022. It was directed by Isaac Ravishankara and shot in Los Angeles.

Track listings

Charts

Weekly charts

Year-end charts

Certifications

Release history

References

2022 singles
2022 songs
Columbia Records singles
George Ezra songs
Songs written by George Ezra